is a Shinto shrine in Matsue, Shimane Prefecture, Japan. The Taisha-zukuri north, central and south halls of 1807 are Important Cultural Properties.

Sada Shin Noh, ritual purification dances performed annually on 24 and 25 September, have been designated an Important Intangible Folk Cultural Property.  In 2011 Sada Shin Noh was inscribed on the UNESCO Representative List of the Intangible Cultural Heritage of Humanity.

See also
 List of Important Intangible Folk Cultural Properties
 Modern system of ranked Shinto Shrines
 Yaegaki Jinja
 Kamosu Jinja
 Izumo Taisha
 Representative List of the Intangible Cultural Heritage of Humanity

References

External links
  Sada Jinja homepage

Shinto shrines in Shimane Prefecture
Important Intangible Folk Cultural Properties
Important Cultural Properties of Japan
Masterpieces of the Oral and Intangible Heritage of Humanity
Noh
Beppyo shrines